Aerlyn Weissman (born 1947 in Chicago, Illinois) is a two-time Genie Award-winning Canadian documentary filmmaker and political activist on behalf of the lesbian community.

Career
Weissman trained in sound recording in the United States before coming to Canada in 1970, and worked as a sound designer at the National Film Board of Canada - one of very few women in that role. She worked on Janis Cole and Holly Dale’s P4W: Prison for Women (1981), and  Hookers on Davie (1984). After the success of Forbidden Love, Weissman collaborated with Lynne Fernie on a film about lesbian writer Jane Rule, the Genie-winning Fiction and Other Truths: A Film About Jane Rule (1995). She also directed the film Without Fear (1993), about women surviving violence.  Weissman's indie documentary Little Sister’s vs Big Brother, a stirring and comprehensive epic of the bookstore's struggles against state censorship, premiered in 2002. Included in the NFB's 2003 queer pedagogical package, this film's heroic portraits of the bookstore's activist triumvirate Janine Fuller, Jim Deva, Bruce Smyth (and writer/employee Mark Macdonald), are already enshrined in the Canadian queer pantheon. Since 2001 Weissman has also directed for the TV documentary series KinK, as well as making WebCam Girls (2004, 52).

She is best known for the Genie Award-winning 1992 film Forbidden Love: The Unashamed Stories of Lesbian Lives, which she co-directed with Lynne Fernie, and the 2002 film Little Sister's vs. Big Brother, about the longstanding censorship battle between Canada Customs and Little Sister's Book and Art Emporium, a prominent LGBT bookstore in Vancouver. She was one of the co-directors, alongside Louise Clark, Jackie Burroughs, John Walker and John Frizzell, of the landmark Canadian feminist feature film A Winter Tan (1987), the controversial semi-fictional account of Maryse Holder's sex odyssey to Mexico.

Her other films include Scams, Schemes, and Scoundrels (1996), Lost Secrets of Ancient Medicine: The Blue Buddha in Russia (2006) and The Portside (2009), as well as episodes of the television series KinK.

Based in Vancouver, Weissman has studied at the Centre for Digital Media and taught at Emily Carr University of Art and Design. Currently, she mentors at the Gulf Islands Film and Television School on Galiano Island, British Columbia. She has also participated in many panels and academic symposiums about filmmaking, and offers workshops at VIVO, a Vancouver Media Arts Centre. She is a member of the Canadian Independent Film Caucus, and Vancouver Women in Film and Television, and received the award for Woman of the Year in 1996. Now living on the West Coast of British Columbia, she continues to explore her interest in independent cinema and innovative television.

Alongside documentary making, Weissman has worked on digital media projects including interactive signage for Sky Train commuters of InTransit BC, creating a template for heritage tourism in BC with The Saturna Project, and sustainable strategies for the fishing industry with the UBC Fisheries Project.

Weissman's documentary Little Sister's vs. Big Brother was included in the NFB's 2003 queer pedagogical package.

She is interviewed in Matthew Hays' 2007 Lambda Literary Award-winning book The View from Here: Conversations with Gay and Lesbian Filmmakers.

Themes 
Aerlyn Weissman's work has covered topics ranging from forensic archaeology, digital technologies, censorship, and social software. She is also interested in politics and aesthetics of urban space, locative art/mapping, public rituals, and peace building.

Her work is deeply engaged with Canadian women's, sexual, and lesbian history. She has remarked that Studio D films often ignored the Canadian context and wanted to take on the “politics of specificity”.

Personal life
Aerlyn Weissman was born in Chicago and moved to Canada in 1970.

Awards 
Fiction and Other Truths: A Film About Jane Rule won the 1996 Genie Award for Best Short Documentary, the L.A. Outfest Outstanding Documentary Short Film, as well as Best Documentary at the San Francisco International Lesbian & Gay Film Festival. Weissman also won the Genie Award for Best Feature Length Documentary in 1993 for Forbidden Love: The Unashamed Stories of Lesbian Lives. Her first feature film, A Winter Tan was nominated for Best Picture, Best Direction, Best Actress, and Best Sound at the 1989 Genies. She received the Vancouver Women in Film and Television award for Woman of the Year in 1996. She has received two Gemini Awards for her recording excellence. She was awarded the Mayor's Arts Award for Film and New Media in 2009 by the City of Vancouver. [10] She received an honourable mention in 2008 for her film Crossing at the Webby Awards. For her film Webcam Girls has a HotDocs Selection.

Filmography

Director
A Winter Tan, 1987
Forbidden Love: The Unashamed Stories of Lesbian Lives, 1992
Fiction and Other Truths: A Film About Jane Rule, 1995
Scams, Schemes, and Scoundrels, 2002
Little Sister's vs. Big Brother, 2002
KinK, 2002-2003
Lost Secrets of Ancient Medicine: The Journey of the Blue Buddha, 2006
Lost Secrets of Ancient Medicine: The Blue Buddha in Russia, 2006
The Portside, 2009
Beyond Gay: The Politics of Pride, 2009

Sound
My Friends Call Me Tony, 1975
Tree Power, 1979
A Wives' Tale (Une histoire de femmes), 1980
The Breakthrough, 1981
The KGB Connections, 1982
Portrait of the Artist... as an Old Lady, 1982
Body by Garret, 1982
Hookers on Davie, 1984
Inner Rhythm 1986
Blue Snake, 1986
No Way! Not Me, 1987
Eternal Earth, 1987
Artist on Fire, 1987
Calling the Shots, 1988
Strand: Under the Dark Cloth, 1989
Meeting Place, 1990
Distress Signals, 1990
John Wyre: Drawing on Sound, 1991

See also 
 List of female film and television directors
 List of lesbian filmmakers
 List of LGBT-related films directed by women

References

External links
 

1947 births
Living people
Canadian documentary film directors
Canadian television directors
Canadian women film directors
LGBT film directors
LGBT people from Illinois
Film directors from Illinois
People from Chicago
20th-century Canadian LGBT people
Film directors from Vancouver
Academic staff of the Emily Carr University of Art and Design
Directors of Genie and Canadian Screen Award winners for Best Documentary Film
Directors of Genie and Canadian Screen Award winners for Best Short Documentary Film
Canadian women television directors
LGBT television directors
21st-century Canadian LGBT people
Canadian women documentary filmmakers
Canadian lesbian artists